In Aristotelian logic, Baralipton (also Bamalip or Bramantip) is a mnemonic word used to identify a form of syllogism. Specifically, the first two propositions are universal affirmative (A), and the third (conclusion) particular affirmative (I)-- hence BARALIPTON. The argument is also in the First Figure (the middle term is the subject of the first premise and the predicate of the second premise), and therefore would be found in the first portion of the full mnemonic poem as formulated by William of Sherwood; later this syllogism came to be considered one of the Fourth Figure.

Generally stated: 
All M is P
All S is M
Therefore some P is S. 

For example,

Every evil ought to be feared.
Every violent passion is an evil.
Therefore, some things that ought to be feared are violent passions.

In traditional Aristotelian logic, Baralipton is just a weakened form of Barbara (where the conclusion is also universal affirmative: All S are P).

According to modern logic, Baralipton commits the existential fallacy.

Term logic
Syllogism